Nadur is a village in the Orathanadu taluk of Thanjavur district, Tamil Nadu, India.

Demographics 

As per the 2001 census, Nadur had a total population of 3011 with 1493 males and 1518 females. The sex ratio was 1017. The literacy rate was 75.35.

References 

 

Villages in Thanjavur district